(May the God of hope fill you), TWV 1:634, BWV 218, is a church cantata by Georg Philipp Telemann formerly credited to Johann Sebastian Bach. It was composed for Whit Sunday in Eisenach in 1717, with text by Erdmann Neumeister. The closing chorale is the first stanza of Martin Luther's hymn for Pentecost "".

Scoring and structure 
The cantata is scored for soprano, alto, tenor, and bass soloists, a four-part choir, two horns, two violins, viola and basso continuo.

It has five movements:
Chorus: 
Aria (alto): 
Recitative (soprano): 
Aria (soprano): 
Chorale:

Recording 
Alsfelder Vokalensemble / Steintor Barock Bremen, Wolfgang Helbich. The Apocryphal Bach Cantatas. CPO, 1991.

References

External links 

 

Church cantatas
1717 compositions
Sacred vocal music by Georg Philipp Telemann
Bach: spurious and doubtful works
German church music